The obuch, obuszek or obuszysko is a type of melee weapon, very similar to a horseman's pick but differing from it with a curved beak opposite the hammer. Most often there was a hammer on the opposite side of the blade.

Used from the 16th to the 18th century by the Szlachta (Polish nobility), it often had a shaft length of 80–100 cm and was carried like a staff and was often bound in velvet and gold twine.

It was a weapon often used in duels and brawls. It was supposed to be safer than a horseman's pick, from which it was made, but the difference was not great, for which reason it was forbidden to bring this type of weapon to sejmiks and also to some churches.

In old Poland, wearing an obuch was so common (for nobles) that it spawned the saying:  ("An obuch is to a sabre as bedding is to a bed"). It was a common secondary weapon to a Polish sabre (karabela).

Sources 
 Polish Renaissance Warfare: obuch, hammer, czekan
 Zdzisław Żygulski (junior), 1982: Broń w dawnej Polsce na tle uzbrojenia Europy i Bliskiego Wschodu. Warszawa: PWN. ISBN 83-01-02512-8

Hammers
Renaissance-era weapons
Polearms
Weapons of Poland